The following is a list of recurring Saturday Night Live characters and sketches introduced between September 26, 2009, and May 15, 2010, the thirty-fifth season of SNL.

Pete Twinkle and Greg Stink
Jason Sudeikis and Will Forte are commentators in an ESPN Classic presentation of a women's sporting event from the 1980s or 1990s. While Sudeikis' Pete Twinkle attempts to engage Forte's Greg Stink in actual discussion or analysis of the event, Greg is incapable of even basic conversation. (Pete: "She just crushed a shot put with her bare hands!" Greg: "I've gotta correct you, Pete! She doesn't have bear hands, she has HUMAN hands! And people don't really say 'bear hands', they say 'paws.'")

The heart of the sketch is in the frequent asides where Pete promotes the feminine or sexual product sponsoring that day's event, using rhyming jingles such as "KY Jelly: Protect her from your girth, with the greatest lube on earth!"

The sketches are written by Forte, Sudeikis, and SNL writers John Lutz and John Solomon. At the end of the 2009-2010 season, Forte told The A.V. Club, "I dislike the overuse of recurring characters as much as the next person, but we just have so much fun doing that sketch. I know we've done it a lot this year, but God, we have fun. That's kind of what it's all about."

In January 2010, Pete Twinkle and Greg Stink hosted a two-hour special, SNL Presents: Sports All-Stars, featuring sports-related SNL clips.

Appearances

What Up with That?

Talk show host Diondre Cole (Kenan Thompson) constantly interrupts his guests by breaking into song and introducing gimmicky performers. His third guest is always Lindsey Buckingham (played by Bill Hader) who never gets an opportunity to utter a word. On the May 14, 2011, episode, the real Lindsey Buckingham appears and manages to get a few words in, attempting to explain how there happens to be two of him, but he is cut off by Diondre Cole breaking back into his song before he can do so.

Appearances

Hollywood Dish
Bill Hader and Kristen Wiig play obnoxious celebrity interviewers Brady Trunk and Anastasia Sticks.

A typical Hollywood Dish sketch starts with Trunk and Sticks introducing themselves to their guest just before the interview starts. During the interview they distract their guest by making strange faces and gestures. The guest becomes more and more uncomfortable throughout the interview. They tempt the guest in giving an over-the-top reaction to some experience she has had. The guest becomes so uncomfortable she wants to leave, but is convinced to answer one more question. This question is about her opinion about a television show the guest has not seen. Bill Hader does a spit-take in response. The guest leaves when she realises the interviewers are not listening to her anymore. The sketch ends with a promo to the recording in which Trunk and Sticks question their guest's sanity, showing the over-the-top reaction.

Appearances

Roger Brush
Fred Armisen stars in this sketch where a talk show's female host is unavailable and the show's abrasive, vulgar and misogynistic producer fills in to answer the audience's questions.  Bill Hader appears as a crew member getting the questions from the audience.

Appearances

Secret Word
A parody of the 1960s game show Password, in which two contestants must guess hidden words based on clues from their celebrity partners. Bill Hader plays host Lyle Round, who often makes rude wisecracks about his wife; Kristen Wiig plays celebrity contestant Mindy Grayson, a washed-up stage actress. The celebrities spend more time displaying their egos and less on the game, which they are never good at playing. Kenan Thompson, as Grant Choad, took over Hader's role whenever Kristen returned to host. 

The "Secret Word" sketches are written by James Anderson and Kent Sublette.

Appearances

Kickspit Underground Festival
As DJ Supersoak and Li'l Blaster, Jason Sudeikis and Nasim Pedrad host a series of commercials for bizarre music festivals, parodying the Gathering of the Juggalos. Bobby Moynihan appears in each one as special guest Ass Dan, and once as his identical twin brother, Butt Dave; Jay Pharoah appeared three times as "charity" promoter MC George Castanza.

The sketches are written by Mike O'Brien and Colin Jost; according to O'Brien, they were originally prompted by seeing a lengthy infomercial for the Gathering:Colin and I decided we were going to write a parody. We came back at 3 a.m. I sat at the keyboard and he would doze in and out of sleep. Every once in a while he'd say something. "Hot dog explosion. Cast of Growing Pains." Then he'd go back to sleep. Then it would be both of us staring for a while. "Fart Monsters. Return of the Fart Monsters. Mrs. Potato Dick." And that's the first one where I really couldn't stop laughing.

Appearances

The original sketch was first performed in dress rehearsal for the November 14, 2009, episode, featuring the episode's host January Jones instead of Pedrad, but was cut before airing. The version with Pedrad was performed in dress rehearsal for the November 21, 2009, episode, but was again cut before airing.

On the April 17, 2010, episode, the characters appeared in an "Underground Rock Minute" sketch introducing a new video from the "Thrilla Killa Klownz", played by Moynihan, as Ass Dan, and the episode's host Ryan Phillippe. The video was a parody of the video for the Insane Clown Posse's song "Miracles".

Tina Tina Chanuse
Jenny Slate plays the proprietor of an array of custom doorbells, car horns and alarm clocks, each of which features Cheneuse's voice simply speaking a phrase (such as, in a doorbell for someone who likes computers, "Ding dong! Router! Netflix! What?").

Appearances

Garth and Kat
Fred Armisen and Kristen Wiig appear on Weekend Update as a singing team who are clearly making up their songs on the fly.  Each sketch ends with Armisen asking to perform one more song, and Wiig asking to perform many more, with Meyers agreeing to just one.  The final song begins with Armisen and Wiig singing an actual prepared song with music.  As Meyers admits that he likes the song, it quickly breaks down into an improvised mess.

Wiig confirmed in an interview that Garth and Kat performances are unrehearsed; Armisen leads each song and she "just [tries] to follow." She told Movieline, "It's the most fun I have because so much of the show is writing, working, deadlines, trying to figure things out, punching up your sketch, knowing you're going to perform live. And that two and a half minutes of airtime is so freeing and fun."

Appearances

The Manuel Ortiz Show
Fred Armisen hosts a Latino talk show in which everyone dances wildly as each guest enters or exits.

Appearances

Bedelia
Nasim Pedrad plays an adolescent girl who finds her parents and other adults to be much more enthralling than kids her own age.

Appearances

In the dress rehearsal for the December 18, 2010, episode (hosted by Jeff Bridges), a sketch appeared in which Bedelia wanted to hang out with her drama teacher (Bridges) rather than her classmates; the sketch was cut for the live episode.

The Devil
Jason Sudeikis appears on Weekend Update to comment on the week's news as the Devil. Sudeikis has also appeared as Jesus in several sketches, portraying an almost identical personality and mannerisms as his portrayal of the Devil.

Appearances

Mort Mort Feingold - Accountant for the Stars
Mort Mort Feingold (Andy Samberg) is an old-school, low tech, Jewish CPA with an old-fashioned adding machine on his desk and stacks upon stacks of paper files all over his office. He specializes in preparing tax returns for wealthy celebrities, and the sketches lampoon the publicly perceived lifestyles, eccentricities, and vices of those celebrities through Mort Mort's comments about their financial records. Mort Mort himself is a composite of good-natured Jewish stereotypes, and throughout each sketch he delivers a steady stream of Borscht Belt comic style self-deprecating one liners about himself and about his clients' public images. A running gag in the sketches is that Mort Mort is extremely short of stature.  In one installment of the sketch, he displays a photo of himself with his good friend Danny DeVito, which has been digitally manipulated to make Andy Samberg (in character as Mort Mort) appear to be several inches shorter than DeVito. The illusion of shortness is achieved in the live sketch via very simple forced perspective (specifically, Samberg is seated behind a normal-height desk on an unseen extremely low chair).

Appearances

Anthony Crispino
Bobby Moynihan appears on Weekend Update as a "second-hand news correspondent", offering the latest headlines, each of which he's slightly misunderstood (for example, that President Obama is "going to repeal the Bush haircuts").
Appearances

References

Lists of recurring Saturday Night Live characters and sketches
Saturday Night Live in the 2010s
Saturday Night Live in the 2000s
Saturday Night Live
Saturday Night Live